Herbétet is  a mountain in  the Gran Paradiso massif, a sub-group of the Graian Alps, with an elevation of 3,778 m. It is located between the Cogne Valley and the Valsavarenche Valley.

Notes

Maps
 Italian official cartography (Istituto Geografico Militare - IGM); on-line version: www.pcn.minambiente.it
 Istituto Geografico Centrale - Carta dei sentieri e dei rifugi  1:50.000 scale n.3 Parco Nazionale del Gran Paradiso and 1:25.000 n.101 Gran Paradiso, La Grivola, Cogne

External links
Page at SummitPost

Mountains of Aosta Valley
Mountains of the Graian Alps
Alpine three-thousanders